Ding Ning successfully defended their title by defeating Zhu Yuling 11–4, 9–11, 4–11, 12–10, 11–6, 11–7 in the final.

Seeds
Matches were best of 7 games in qualification and in the 128-player sized main draw.

  Ding Ning (champion)
  Liu Shiwen (semifinals)
  Zhu Yuling (final)
  Feng Tianwei (quarterfinals)
  Chen Meng (quarterfinals)
  Kasumi Ishikawa (quarterfinals)
  Cheng I-ching (second round)
  Miu Hirano (semifinals)
  Mima Ito (fourth round)
  Hitomi Sato (third round)
  Doo Hoi Kem (second round)
  Liu Jia  (third round)
  Petrissa Solja (second round)
  Li Jie (fourth round)
  Yu Mengyu (second round)
  Yang Ha-eun  (third round)
  Kim Song-i (fourth round)
  Matilda Ekholm (first round)
  Georgina Póta (second round)
  Seo Hyo-won (third round)
  Elizabeta Samara (fourth round)
  Miyu Kato (fourth round)
  Lee Ho Ching (third round)
  Li Qian  (third round)
  Sabine Winter (second round)
  Chen Szu-yu (third round)
  Kim Kyungah  (third round)
  Daniela Dodean (fourth round)
  Soo Wai Yam Minnie (third round)
  Polina Mikhailova (second round)
  Sofia Polcanova (second round)
  Tetyana Sorochynska (second round)
  Ng Wing Nam (second round)
  Viktoria Pavlovich (second round)
  Bernadette Szőcs (second round)
  Suthasini Sawettabut (second round)
  Kristin Silbereisen (fourth round)
  Ni Xialian (third round)
  Natalia Partyka (second round)
  Britt Eerland (second round)
  Zhang Mo (third round)
  Katarzyna Grzybowska (first round)
  Ri Mi-gyong (second round)
  Nanthana Komwong (second round)
  Adriana Díaz (second round)
  Cheng Hsien-tzu (second round)
  Adina Diaconu (second round)
  Hana Matelová (first round)
  Yana Noskova (second round)
  Lee Zi-on (third round)
  Lily Zhang (third round)
  Dóra Madarász (second round)
  Ganna Gaponova (first round)
  Mak Tze Wing (first round)
  Szandra Pergel  (third round)
  María Xiao (fourth round)
  Jian Fang Lay (second round)
  Manika Batra (second round)
  Galia Dvorak (second round)
  Irina Ciobanu (first round)
  Eva Ódorová (second round)
  Yoo Eun-chong (second round)
  Rūta Paškauskienė (second round)
  Sarah De Nutte (second round)

Draw

Finals

Top half

Section 1

Section 2

Section 3

Section 4

Bottom half

Section 5

Section 6

Section 7

Section 8

References

External links
Main draw

Women's singles
World